Girls & Boys or Girls and Boys may refer to:

 Girls & Boys (play), 2018 play by British playwright Dennis Kelly 
Girls and Boys (album), an album by Ingrid Michaelson from 2006
"Girls & Boys" (Prince song), a Prince song from 1986
"Girls & Boys" (Blur song), a Blur song from 1994
"Girls & Boys" (Good Charlotte song), a Good Charlotte song from 2003
"Girls & Boys" (The Subways song), a Subways song from 2008

See also
Boys and Girls (disambiguation)